The 2018 LFF I Lyga was the 29th season of the I Lyga, the second tier association football league of Lithuania. The season began on 25 March 2018 and ended on 20 October 2018.

Teams

Changes from last season
A total of fifteen clubs were confirmed for the season, same as previous season, but only fourteen competed as Šilutė withdrew 4 days prior to the league's start after an uncompetitive performance in the 2018 Žemaitijos Taurė. Three of them were reserve teams of the A Lyga sides - one less than maximum allowed for the competitions and last season number.

Utenis were relegated from the 2017 A Lyga and replaced last year champions Palanga. Only the II Lyga South Zone winners NFA were automatically promoted from the lower tier as other eligible teams failed to receive licenses. Finally Kupiškis made their debut in the league after a special permission was given by the Lithuanian Football Federation to compete for a newly created team.

Stadiums, personnel and sponsorship

League table

Results

Attendance

Average home attendances

Highest attendances

References

External links
 

I Lyga seasons
2018 in Lithuanian football
Lith
Lith